Anatoma tabulata is a species of minute sea snail, a marine gastropod mollusk or micromollusk in the family Anatomidae.

Distribution
This marine species occurs in the Indian Ocean off KwaZuluNatal, South Africa.

References

 Geiger D.L. (2012) Monograph of the little slit shells. Volume 1. Introduction, Scissurellidae. pp. 1-728. Volume 2. Anatomidae, Larocheidae, Depressizonidae, Sutilizonidae, Temnocinclidae. pp. 729–1291. Santa Barbara Museum of Natural History Monographs Number 7

External links
 To Encyclopedia of Life
 To World Register of Marine Species

Anatomidae
Gastropods described in 1964